Microdonia is a genus of rove beetles in the family Staphylinidae. There are at least four described species in Microdonia.

Species
These four species belong to the genus Microdonia:
 Microdonia kansana Seevers, 1959 i c g
 Microdonia laticollis (Brues, 1902) i c g
 Microdonia nitidiventris (Brues, 1904) i c g b
 Microdonia occipitalis Casey, 1893 i c g
Data sources: i = ITIS, c = Catalogue of Life, g = GBIF, b = Bugguide.net

References

Further reading

 
 
 
 

Aleocharinae
Articles created by Qbugbot